Rizwan "Riz" Khan (born August 1962
) is a British broadcaster of Asian origin.

From 2006 until April 2011 he hosted his own eponymous television show on Al Jazeera English. He first rose to prominence while working for the BBC and CNN.

Early life
Khan was born in Aden, South Yemen, to a Pakistani Punjabi father and an Indian Gujarati mother. His father was from Amritsar and migrated to Pakistan during the partition, while his mother's roots go back to Kathiawar, Gujarat. Khan moved with his family to London, at the age of four. He identifies himself as the first mainstream BBC and CNN newscaster of South Asian origin. Khan is a Muslim by religion.

He attended both Springwell Junior and Hounslow Manor Comprehensive Schools and joined the Air Training Corps. He graduated with a Bachelor of Science with Honours in Medical Physiology from the University of Wales, and then took a postgraduate course in Radio Journalism at the Highbury College near Portsmouth.

Broadcasting career
In 1987 he was selected for the BBC News Trainee scheme - a two-year BBC training system, usually taking only 6 people per course. Khan progressed to jobs as a BBC reporter, producer, and writer, working in both television and radio, and would later become one of the founding News Presenters on BBC World Service Television News. He hosted the news bulletin that launched BBC World Service Television News in 1991. In 1993, he moved to CNN International, where he became a senior anchor for the network's global news shows. Events he covered included the 1996 and 1999 coverage of elections in India; the 1997 historic election in Britain; and in April 1998 the unprecedented live coverage from the Muslim pilgrimage, the Hajj.

In 1996 he launched his interactive interview show CNN: Q&A with Riz Khan, and he has conducted interviews with guests including former UN Secretary General Kofi Annan, former US Presidents Jimmy Carter and Bill Clinton, the Dalai Lama and Nelson Mandela, and genomic scientist J. Craig Venter. Khan also secured the world exclusive with Pakistan's General Pervez Musharraf following his coup in October 1999. Khan also hosted Q&A-Asia with Riz Khan. 
These interactive shows put world newsmakers and celebrities up for viewer questions live by phone, e-mail, video-mail, and fax, along with questions and comments taken from the real-time chatroom that opens half-an-hour before each show.

From 2006 until April 2011, Khan had his own eponymous show on Al Jazeera English, in which he interviewed analysts and policy-makers and invited viewers to interact with them via phone, email, SMS messages or fax.

Khan speaks Urdu and Hindi and also understands other South Asian languages such as Punjabi and Kutchi. He has studied French, and can understand some other European languages, including Swedish and Norwegian.

In 2005 he authored his first book, Al-Waleed: Businessman Billionaire Prince, published by HarperCollins.

In 2011 he authored a preface for the Committee to Protect Journalists (CPJ) annual report "Attacks on the Press 2010", which examined working conditions for journalists in more than 100 countries.

References

External links
 Profile at Al Jazeera English

1962 births
Al Jazeera people
Alumni of Cardiff University
Alumni of the University of Portsmouth
British male journalists
British people of Pakistani descent
British television presenters
British people of Indian descent
British Sunni Muslims
Gujarati people
Living people
British people of Punjabi descent
British people of Gujarati descent
Aden emigrants to England